Khabar Rural District is a rural district (dehestan) in Dehaj District, Shahr-e Babak County, Kerman Province, Iran. At the 2006 census, its population was 4,089, in 804 families. The rural district has 44 villages.

References 

Rural Districts of Kerman Province
Shahr-e Babak County